Briona is a comune (municipality) in the Province of Novara in the Italian region Piedmont, located about  northeast of Turin and about  northwest of Novara.

The municipality of Briona contains the frazioni (subdivisions, mainly villages and hamlets) San Bernardino and Proh.

Briona borders the following municipalities: Barengo, Caltignaga, Carpignano Sesia, Casaleggio Novara, Castellazzo Novarese, Fara Novarese, Momo, San Pietro Mosezzo, and Sillavengo.

Demographic evolution

References

External links
 www.comune.briona.no.it/

Cities and towns in Piedmont